Cathy Bissoon (born May 16, 1968) is a United States district judge of the United States District Court for the Western District of Pennsylvania. Previously, she was a United States magistrate judge of the same court. She was appointed to her current position by President Barack Obama and was confirmed by the United States Senate in October 2011.

Early life and education
Bissoon was born on May 16, 1968 in Brooklyn, New York. Bissoon's father was from Puerto Rico and her mother from Trinidad. When Bissoon was four years old, her father was killed in a stabbing close to the family home in the Williamsburg neighborhood of Brooklyn. Bissoon's mother later remarried and the family moved to Queens, New York. Bissoon attended Alfred University in New York, where she graduated summa cum laude with a Bachelor of Arts in political science in 1990. She  earned her Juris Doctor from Harvard Law School in 1993.

Career
After completing law school, Bissoon joined the Pittsburgh, Pennsylvania office of Reed Smith, practicing in the firm's labor and employment group. While at Reed Smith, Bissoon took a one-year leave of absence to serve as a law clerk for Judge Gary L. Lancaster of the United States District Court for the Western District of Pennsylvania. In 2007, Bissoon joined the Pittsburgh law firm of Cohen & Grigsby where she was the Director of the firm's Labor & Employment Group.

Judicial service
In July 2008, Bissoon was selected to serve as a United States magistrate judge of the United States District Court for the Western District of Pennsylvania, replacing Judge Francis X. Caiazza. She joined the bench on August 1, 2008, and is the first woman of color to sit on the federal bench in Pittsburgh. Bissoon, who is Hispanic and Indian, is also the first woman of Indian descent to sit on a federal court in the United States.

During the 111th Congress, Pennsylvania Senators Arlen Specter and Bob Casey recommended Bissoon for a seat on the Western District of Pennsylvania. On November 17, 2010, President Barack Obama formally nominated Bissoon to be a United States district court judge, to replace Thomas Hardiman, who was elevated to the United States Court of Appeals for the Third Circuit on April 2, 2007. On October 17, 2011, the Senate voted 82–3 to confirm Bissoon. She received her commission on October 19, 2011. With her appointment, Judge Bissoon became the first Hispanic female Article III judge in Pennsylvania and the first Asian American Article III judge in Pennsylvania.

Awards and recognition
Judge Bissoon was honored as one of five finalists for the 2010 Athena Award. The award honors female leaders in the region who demonstrate excellence, creativity and initiative in business, who provide time and energy to improve the quality of life of others and who actively assist other women in realizing their full leadership potential.

In 2010, Judge Bissoon also was honored by Pittsburgh Professional Women as one of their 2010 Women of Integrity. The award is given to women who have distinguished themselves as leaders who balance career and civic responsibilities, while sharing their success by mentoring others and supporting their communities.

See also

List of Asian American jurists
List of first women lawyers and judges in Pennsylvania
List of first women lawyers and judges in the United States
List of Hispanic/Latino American jurists
List of Puerto Ricans
List of Indian Americans

References

External links

1968 births
Living people
Alfred University alumni
American jurists of Asian descent
Harvard Law School alumni
Hispanic and Latino American judges
Judges of the United States District Court for the Western District of Pennsylvania
People from Williamsburg, Brooklyn
United States district court judges appointed by Barack Obama
21st-century American judges
United States magistrate judges
21st-century American women judges